Mold is a town and community in Flintshire, Wales, on the River Alyn. It is the county town and administrative seat of Flintshire County Council, as it was of Clwyd from 1974 to 1996. According to the 2011 UK census, it had a population of 10,058. A 2019 estimate puts it at 10,123.

Origin of the name
The original Welsh-language place name, Yr Wyddgrug, was recorded as Gythe Gruc in a document of 1280–1281, and means "The Mound of the Tomb/Sepulchre".

The name "Mold" originates from the Norman-French mont-hault ("high hill"). The name was originally applied to the site of Mold Castle in connection with its builder Robert de Montalt, an Anglo-Norman lord. It is recorded as Mohald in a document of 1254.

History

A mile west of the town is Maes Garmon ("The Field of Germanus"), the traditional site of the "Alleluia Victory" by a force of Romano-Britons led by Germanus of Auxerre against the invading Picts and Scots, which occurred shortly after Easter, AD 430.

Mold developed around Mold Castle. The motte and bailey were built by the Norman Robert de Montalt in around 1140 in conjunction with the military invasion of Wales by Anglo-Norman forces. The castle was besieged numerous times by the Princes of Gwynedd as they fought to retake control of the eastern cantrefi in the Perfeddwlad (English: Middle Country). In 1146, Owain Gwynedd captured the castle. By 1167, Henry II was in possession of the castle, although it was recaptured by the Welsh forces of Llywelyn the Great in 1201.

Anglo-Norman authority over the area began again in 1241 when Dafydd ap Llywelyn yielded possession of the castle to the de Montalt family. However, he recaptured it from the Plantagenet nobility in 1245. The next few decades were a period of peace; Llywelyn ap Gruffudd built the Welsh native castle of Ewloe further to the east, establishing the House of Gwynedd's military control over the area. Under Welsh rule, Mold Castle was deemed to be a "royal stronghold". It was recaptured by the forces of Edward I during the first months of the war of 1276–77. Mold Castle was still a substantial fortification at the outbreak of the rebellion by Madog ap Llywelyn in 1294. However, with the death of the last Lord Montalt in 1329, the castle's importance began to decline. The last mention of the fortification is in Patent Rolls from the early 15th century.

With the end of the Welsh Wars, English common law was introduced by the Statute of Rhuddlan. This led to an increase in commercial enterprise in the township which had been laid out around Mold Castle. Trade soon began between the Welsh community and English merchants in Chester and Whitchurch, Shropshire. During the medieval period, the town held two annual fairs and a weekly market, which brought in substantial revenues, as drovers brought their livestock to the English-Welsh border to be sold.

Nevertheless, tensions between the Welsh and the English remained. During the War of the Roses, Reinalt ab Grufydd ab Bleddyn, a Lancastrian captain who defended Harlech Castle for Henry VI against Yorkist forces, was constantly engaged in feuds with Chester. In 1465 a large number of armed men from Chester arrived at the Mold fair looking for trouble. A fight broke out which led to a pitched battle; eventually Reinalt triumphed and captured Robert Bryne, a former Mayor of Chester. The Welsh captain then took Bryne back to his tower house near Mold and hanged him. In retaliation, up to 200 men-at-arms were sent from Chester to seize Reinalt. However, the Welshman used his military experience to turn the tables on his attackers. He hid in the woods while many of the men entered his home; once they were inside, he rushed from concealment, blocked the door, and set fire to the building, trapping those inside. Reinalt then attacked the remainder, driving them back towards Chester.

By the late 15th century, the lordships around Mold had passed to the powerful Stanley family. In 1477 records mention that Thomas Stanley, 1st Earl of Derby had appointed numerous civic officials in Mold (including a mayor), was operating several mills, and had established a courthouse in the town.

16th century onwards

In the 1530s, the Tudor antiquarian John Leland noted the weekly market had been abandoned. By now Mold had two main streets, Streate Byle (Beili) and Streate Dadlede (Dadleu-dy), and about 40 houses making up the settlement. By the beginning of the 17th century, the population was rising with the development of the coal industry near the town. By the 1630s there were more than 120 houses and huts in the area.

The government of Elizabeth I had established royal representatives (Justices of the Peace, Sheriffs, and Lords Lieutenant) in every county of Wales. Mold developed into the administrative centre for Flintshire. By the 1760s, the Quarter Sessions were based in the town; the county hall was established in 1833, and the county gaol in 1871.

In 1833, workmen digging a Bronze Age mound at Bryn yr Ellyllon (Fairies' or Goblins' Hill) found a unique golden cape dating from 1900 to 1600 BCE. It weighs  and was made from a single gold ingot about the size of a golf ball. It was broken when found and the fragments shared among the workmen, with the largest piece for Mr Langford, tenant of the field in which the mound stood. The find was recorded by the Vicar of Mold and came to the notice of the British Museum. In 1836 Langford sold his piece to the museum, which has since acquired most of the pieces, though it is said that some wives of the workmen sported new jewellery after the find. The restored cape now belongs to the British Museum.

Mold hosted the National Eisteddfod in 1923, 1991 and 2007. There was an unofficial National Eisteddfod event in 1873.

Mold was linked to Chester by the Mold Railway, with a large British Rail station and adjacent marshalling yards and engine sheds; however, the latter closed when Croes Newydd at Wrexham was opened, as did the station in 1962 in the Beeching cuts. However, the track survived until the mid-1980s to serve the Synthite chemical works. A Tesco supermarket was built on the station site in the 1990s.

The Mold Riot
In summer 1869 there was a riot in the town which had considerable effect on the subsequent policing of public disturbances in Britain.

On 17 May 1869, John Young, the English manager of the nearby colliery in Leeswood, angered his workers by announcing a pay cut. He had previously strained relationships with them by banning the use of the Welsh language underground. Two days later, after a meeting at the pithead, miners attacked Young before frogmarching him to the police station. Seven men were arrested and ordered to stand trial on 2 June. All were found guilty, and the convicted ringleaders, Ismael Jones and John Jones, were sentenced to a month's hard labour.

A large crowd assembled to hear the verdict. The Chief Constable of Flintshire arranged for the presence of police from all over the county and soldiers from the 4th King's Own Regiment (Lancaster), based temporarily at Chester. As the convicts were transferred to the railway station, a crowd of 1500–2000 grew restive and threw missiles at the officers, injuring many. Soldiers under their commanding officer, Captain Blake, opened fire on the crowd, killing four people. They included an innocent bystander, Margaret Younghusband, a 19-year-old domestic servant from Liverpool, who had been observing events from nearby high ground. The others killed were two colliers, Robert Hannaby and Edward Bellis, and Elizabeth Jones, who was shot in the back and died two days later.

A coroner's inquest on the first three deaths was held on 5 June. The coroner, Peter Parry, was reportedly "exceedingly old and infirm", "so deaf as to be compelled to use a 'speaking' trumpet" and partially blind. He was assisted by the deputy coroner, his brother Robert Parry. The jury's verdict, after clear direction from the coroner and retiring for only five minutes to consider the matter, was justifiable homicide. Later that afternoon, a second inquest on the death of Elizabeth Jones reached the same verdict.

The following week several men – Isaac Jones, William Griffiths, Rowland Jones, Gomer Jones and William Hughes – were tried for involvement in the riot. They were found guilty of "felonious wounding" and Lord Chief Justice Bovill sentenced all to ten years' penal servitude.

Although denying the connection, Daniel Owen, who lived in the town, featured some similar events in his first novel, Rhys Lewis, which was published in instalments in 1882–1884.

Transport
Mold railway station closed to passengers in 1962. The nearest station is now Buckley, which has services to Wrexham and Bidston. Flint railway station, to which Mold has regular bus services, is not much further and has direct trains to Cardiff, London and Manchester. There are frequent daytime bus services from the bus station to Chester, Wrexham, Denbigh, Holywell, Ruthin and other places.

Landmarks

Mold Town Hall was completed in 1912.
Loggerheads Country Park is nearby. 
St Mary's Church, Mold is the town's parish church, dating from the 15th century.

Amenities
Mold Library shares a building with the local tourist information office, which also provides a sales outlet for local arts and crafts.

Mold is a cittaslow – the first town in Wales to achieve the distinction. It has a street market on Wednesday and Saturday for fresh produce and other goods. For speciality and fresh local food, Celyn Farmers' Market is held on the first and third Saturdays of each month.

The Mold Food and Drink Festival is held each September, with a main event area on the edge of the town centre and many central and nearby businesses contributing. 2012 saw Mold's first annual November Fest, a beer festival held at venues in and around Mold to promote real ale, cider and wine.

Schools
Two secondary schools serve Mold and the surrounding villages. Alun School has about 1,800 pupils and is the largest school in the county. It is adjoined by Ysgol Maes Garmon, Flintshire's only Welsh-medium secondary school.

The town also has the largest primary school in the county, Ysgol Bryn Coch, with about 650 pupils. Ysgol Glanrafon is bilingual.

Business
Companies based in Mold include NWN Media, publisher of The Leader.

Climate
Mold has a typical British maritime climate of cool summers and mild winters. The nearest Met Office weather station for which online records are available is at Loggerheads, about three miles to the west.

Annual rainfall averages 925 mm. Almost 152 days have at least 1 mm of precipitation.

Notable people
Jane Brereton (1685–1740), poet, born at Bryn Gruffydd near Mold
Richard Wilson (1714–1782), landscape painter and founder member of the Royal Academy, settled in Mold in 1781
Thomas Henry Blythe (1822–1883), emigrated to San Francisco, U.S., and became a wealthy businessman
Daniel Owen (1836–1895), novelist writing in Welsh
Wilfred Trubshaw (1870–1944), solicitor, police officer & Chief Constable of Lancashire Constabulary, 1927 to 1935 
Henry Gregory Thompson (1871–1942), Roman Catholic prelate, Bishop of Gibraltar, 1910 to 1927
Raymond Davies Hughes (1923–1999), airman and Nazi collaborator
Jo Stevens (born 1966), Member of Parliament, grew up in Mold
Rhys Ifans (born 1967), actor in films, attended Ysgol Maes Garmon school
Adam Walton (born 1971), BBC Radio Wales DJ, brought up at nearby Nannerch and attended Alun School
Sian Gibson (born 1976), comedy actress and TV writer
Rhodri Meilir (born 1978), actor, raised in the town and educated at Ysgol Maes Garmon school

Sport 
Ron Hughes (born 1930), footballer with 399 club caps with Chester City F.C.
Gavin Roberts (born 1984), rugby union player, with 255 caps with Caldy
Simon Spender (born 1985), football coach and former footballer with over 400 club caps

References

External links

Official Tourism and Business Database search for Mold
Mold Town Council
BBC Wales's Mold website
www.geograph.co.uk : photos of Mold and surrounding area

 
Towns in Flintshire
Mold
Towns of the Welsh Marches
Former county towns in Wales
Communities in Flintshire